Iskandar Ghanem (1911 – 4 February 2005) was a Lebanese army general who was the commander-in-chief of the Lebanese army in the period from 1971 to 1976. He was close to Suleiman Frangieh and held the post during his presidency.

Biography
Ghanem was born in Saghbine, West Bekaa, in 1911 and hailed from a Maronite family. From 1934 he attended the military school and graduated as a second lieutenant in 1937.

He was dismissed from the Lebanese army, but he rejoined the army on 24 July 1971 when he was promoted to the rank of general and appointed commander-in-chief of the army. Ghanem replaced Jean Njeim in the post who died in a helicopter crash on 24 July 1975. In May 1975 Ghanem was also named minister of national defense and minister of electrical and hydraulic resources in the military cabinet led by retired brigadier general Noureddine Abdullah Rifai. Ghanem served as commander-in-chief of the army until his retirement in January 1976. Ghanem's successor was Hanna Said.

Controversy
The Israeli forces attacked the headquarters of Palestinians in Lebanon on 10 April 1973 and killed three Palestinians who were the leaders of the Black September Organization. Upon this incident due to pressures from the Sunni community Prime Minister Saeb Salam requested the dismissal of Iskandar Ghanem, but Salam's request was not accepted by the President Suleiman Frangieh which led to the resignation of Salam.

Personal life and death
Ghanem was married and had three sons. One of his children was Robert Ghanem who was a lawyer and served as the education minister in the second cabinet of Rafik Hariri in the mid-1990s. Iskandar Ghanem died on 4 February 2005. A funeral ceremony was held for him on 7 February in the Maronite Cathedral of Saint George in Beirut.

Awards
Ghanem was the recipient of the Order of the Cedar. He was first awarded the rank of commander and then the rank of grand officer.

References

External links

1911 births
2005 deaths
Lebanese Maronites
Defense ministers of Lebanon
Commanders of the Lebanese Armed Forces
People from Western Beqaa District